Germán Zea Hernández (15 April 1905 — 8 February 1989) was a Colombian lawyer and politician. A Liberal Party politician, he served twice as Permanent Representative of Colombia to the United Nations, and occupied the Ministries of Government, Justice, and Foreign Affairs, was appointed 11th Comptroller General of Colombia, Mayor of Bogotá, and Governor of Cundinamarca, and served in both Chambers of Congress as Senator and Representative.

Personal life
Germán was born on 15 April 1905 in Bogotá to Luis Zea Uribe and Clorinda Hernández Ospina. He married Beatriz Gutiérrez Muñoz, with whom he had two sons, Luis Germán and Juan Manuel, but he also had a daughter out of wedlock with Carlota Soto named Gloria Zea whom married painter Fernando Botero and had a second marriage with Colombian dynasty billionaire Andrés Uribe Campuzano ≤http://www.semana.com/especiales/articulo/gloria-zea/32761-3≥ and creator of the Modern Art Museum of Bogota and one of the main figures of culture and arts in Colombia.

Germán raised Gloria in his household with his wife Beatriz.

References

Further reading
 
 

1905 births
1989 deaths
Politicians from Bogotá
Free University of Colombia alumni
Colombian Liberal Party politicians
Foreign ministers of Colombia
Colombian Ministers of Government
Colombian Ministers of Justice
Comptrollers General of Colombia
Governors of Cundinamarca Department
Mayors of Bogotá
Members of the Chamber of Representatives of Colombia
Members of the Senate of Colombia
Presidents of the Senate of Colombia
Permanent Representatives of Colombia to the United Nations
20th-century Colombian lawyers